Jeffery Wayne King (born February 19, 1983) is a former American football tight end and current co-director of player personnel for the Chicago Bears of the National Football League (NFL). He played college football and basketball for Virginia Tech. He was selected by the Carolina Panthers in the fifth round of the 2006 NFL Draft.

King has also played for the Arizona Cardinals.

High school
A PrepStar All-American for Coach Joel Hicks at Pulaski County High School, King rated the No. 3 tight end in the Atlantic Region. He was named first-team Group AAA all-state as a tight end by the Associated Press and the state coaches. He was ranked the No. 12 prospect in Virginia by The Roanoke Times and SuperPrep. He was an honorable mention All-South pick by the Orlando Sentinel. He led his high school team to the Group AAA, Division 5 state semifinals in 2000. He finished his senior season with 278 yards receiving and eight touchdowns. He also registered eight sacks as a defensive end. He set a school record with 101 pancake blocks in a season. He had 12 pancakes and two receptions for 30 yards and a touchdown in a game his senior year. He was named All-Timesland as a junior and senior.

King was also a basketball player who compiled over 1,000 points and 1,000 rebounds during his career.  He averaged 25 points and 14 rebounds as a senior on the way to all-district and all-region honors.  He also competed in the shot put for the track team with a best effort of 54' 7" as a junior. He was also a member of the National Honor Society.

College career
King redshirted his freshman in 2001. In 2002, King played in all 14 games for Virginia Tech making only one reception, a 19-yard touchdown against Arkansas State. He also blocked a field goal against Western Michigan.

In 2003, King played in 13 games with two starts. He made six receptions for 109 yards and one touchdown. He also blocked a field goal against Rutgers. In 2004, King became a starter. He started all 13 games, posting 25 receptions for 304 yards and four touchdowns. He was also a Second-team All-ACC choice.

In 2005, he started all 13 games.  He recorded a career-high 26 catches for 292 yards and six touchdowns, a school single-season record for tight ends, and became the first player in school history to catch a touchdown pass in four consecutive games. He also blocked a field goal against Georgia Tech that the Hokies returned for a touchdown. He was also a second-team All-ACC selection.

College statistics

In his college career, King set a school record for touchdown catches by a tight end with 11, bettering the previous mark of eight. He also blocked three kicks on special teams.

Professional career

2006
King was selected in the fifth round of the 2006 NFL Draft by the Carolina Panthers. He played in 12 games in his rookie season, and scored a touchdown on his only reception of the season in a game against the Atlanta Falcons.

2007
In 2007 his first year as a starter King recorded 46 receptions for 406 yards and two touchdowns. King made his then career long reception during the Panthers week three win over the Atlanta Falcons, with a 29-yard catch. He also had a single-game career high in receptions with 10 during a week eight loss to the Indianapolis Colts.

2008
With the return of Muhsin Muhammad to the Carolina Panthers, King changed numbers from #87 to #47. King recorded 21 receptions for 195 yards and had one touchdown reception against the Detroit Lions. King also improved his career long catch, with at 31-yard reception against the Arizona Cardinals.

Arizona Cardinals
King was signed by the Arizona Cardinals on July 29, 2011.

Career statistics

Executive career
King was hired by the Chicago Bears as a pro scout in 2016. He was promoted to assistant director of pro scouting in 2019, and promoted again to director of pro scouting on July 6, 2021. On May 3, 2022, the team announced King was promoted to co-director of player personnel along with Trey Koziol.

Personal life
King graduated with a degree in finance and is enrolled in health and physical education in graduate school.

References

External links
 Arizona Cardinals bio

1983 births
Living people
People from Pulaski, Virginia
Players of American football from Virginia
American football tight ends
Virginia Tech Hokies football players
Carolina Panthers players
Arizona Cardinals players
Chicago Bears executives